The 1969 European Figure Skating Championships were held at the Olympia-Eisstadion in Garmisch-Partenkirchen, West Germany. Elite senior-level figure skaters from European ISU member nations competed for the title of European Champion in the disciplines of men's singles, ladies' singles, pair skating, and ice dancing.

Results

Men

Ladies

Pairs

Ice dancing

References

External links
 results

European Figure Skating Championships, 1969
European Figure Skating Championships, 1969
European Figure Skating Championships
Figure skating in West Germany
Sports competitions in Bavaria
Sport in Garmisch-Partenkirchen
1960s in Bavaria